Avvenire (English: "Future") is an Italian daily newspaper which is affiliated with the Catholic Church and is based in Milan.

History and profile
Avvenire was founded in 1968 in Milan through the merger of two Catholic newspapers: L'Avvenire d'Italia of Bologna and l'Italia of Milan. The paper has its headquarters in Milan and is the organ of the progressive wing of the Vatican Council. Pope Paul VI strongly supported the daily and wanted a common cultural medium for Italian Catholics. Throughout its history, Avvenire has maintained this characteristic, despite pressures to accommodate itself to the needs of a society in evolution. For example, in the middle of the 1990s, under the editorship of Dino Boffo, it increased its coverage of civil society and extended the parts of the newspaper devoted to cultural debate.

New initiatives were also launched. In February 1996, a biweekly insert under the name of "Popotus" was published devoted exclusively to youth, for whom three other inserts were also included: "Luoghi dell'Infinito", "Noi Genitori e Figli", "Non Profit". In 1998, an Internet edition began to be published.

The newspaper belongs to the Italian Episcopal Conference. According to journalist Sandro Magister, it follows the doctrinal line of Cardinal Camillo Ruini.

On 7 March 2002, Avvenire experienced a major change with the format and content. From that time, a number of new inserts have been included: "è lavoro" (about job and employment), "è vita" (about bioethics), and "Agorà domenica" (about culture).

These innovations have led to a steady increase in its circulation, significant given the general decline in sales of other Italian newspapers. The average number of copies sold each day in February 2005 was 103,000. As of 2009 Dino Boffo was the editor of the newspaper.

Circulation
In 1997 the circulation of Avvenire was 94,700 copies. It was 97,934 copies in 2004. In 2008 the paper had a circulation of 105,812 copies. The circulation of the paper was 106,306 copies in 2009 and 106,928 copies in 2010.

In 2012 Avvenire sold 45,160,996  copies.

References

External links 
 Avvenire Official Website 

1968 establishments in Italy
Publications established in 1968
Italian-language newspapers
Italian news websites
Newspapers published in Milan
Catholic newspapers published in Italy
Daily newspapers published in Italy
Left-wing newspapers